Saif Ul Haque is an architect and educator based in Dhaka. He received Aga Khan Award for Architecture in 2017-2019 cycle.

Career
Saif Ul Haque completed his bachelor of architecture from Bangladesh University of Engineering and Technology and established Diagram Architects in 1984 with two other partners. He later started his own practice Saif Ul Haque Sthapati.

Notable works

 Arcadia Education Project, South Kanarchor, Bangladesh (2016)
 Design Development Center, Chittagong (2012-) 
 Paramount School and College, Rajshahi (2009) 
 Gyan BIgyan Kendro, Modhupur (2003)
 Govinda Gunalanker Hostel at Chittagong (1999)
 Camp House for an Archaeological Team at Bogra (1996)
 Banchte Shekha Training Center at Jessore (1994)
 BRAC Training Center at Faridpur (1992)

Awards
 IAB Design Award (2002)
 ARCASIA Award (2002)
 J.K. Cement Award (2001) 
 Aga Khan Award for Architecture 2017-2019 cycle, for the Arcadia Education Project.

Exhibition
 Dhaka Art Summit (2015)

Publications
 Sherebanglanagar: Louis I Kahn and the Making of a Capital Complex (2002)
 Pundranagar to Sherebanglanagar: Architecture in Bangladesh (1997)

References

Bangladeshi architects
Living people
Modernist architects
20th-century Bangladeshi architects
21st-century Bangladeshi architects
1958 births
Bangladesh University of Engineering and Technology alumni